China Securities Depository and Clearing Corporation Limited, in short CSDC or ChinaClear, is a central securities depository of China, based in Beijing, in responsible for all securities depository and clearing services for Shanghai and Shenzhen Stock Exchanges.

It was set up on March 30, 2001. In September 2001, Shanghai Securities Central Depository and Clearing Corporation and Shenzhen Securities Depository Corporation, two corporations which were in responsible for depository and clearing services of Shanghai Stock Exchange and Shenzhen Stock Exchange, were merged into the CSDC.

See also 
 ChinaBond
 Shanghai-Hong Kong Stock Connect and Shenzhen-Hong Kong Stock Connect

References 

Financial services companies established in 2001
Xicheng District
2001 establishments in China
Government-owned companies of China
Central securities depositories
Securities clearing and depository institutions